Chugi may refer to:
 Chūgi, a Japanese anal cleaning tool
 Chugi, Iran (disambiguation), places in Iran